Kalki is an avatar of Vishnu in Hinduism.

Kalki may also refer to:

People
Kalki Koechlin (born 1984), Indian actress
Kalki Krishnamurthy (1899–1954), Tamil activist and writer
Kalki Sadasivam (1902–1997), Indian activist, entertainer, and writer

Places
 Kalki, Maharashtra

Books, novels and magazines
Kalki (magazine), a Tamil magazine of news and literature, published since 1941
Kalki (novel), a 1978 Gore Vidal novel

Film and television
 Kalki (1984 film), an Indian Malayalam language film directed by N. Sankaran Nair
 Kalki (1996 film), an Indian Tamil language film directed by K. Balachander
 Kalki (2017 film), an Indian Tamil-language short film
 Kalki (2019 Malayalam film), an Indian Malayalam-language film
 Kalki (2019 Telugu film), an Indian Telugu-language film
 Kalki (TV series), a Tamil soap opera, on air 2004–2006

Other uses
 Elachista kalki, a moth of the family Elachistidae
 Playa Kalki, a beach on the Caribbean island of Curaçao

See also
Kałki (disambiguation), for places in Poland